St. Francis Church is a Roman Catholic church in Riga, the capital of Latvia. The church is situated at the address 16 Katoļu Street in the Maskavas Forštate neighborhood. The building was consecrated in 1892 by Franciszek Albin Symon, the auxiliary bishop of Mohilev.

Gallery

References

External links 
 

Roman Catholic churches in Riga
Roman Catholic churches in Latvia
Roman Catholic churches completed in 1892
19th-century Roman Catholic church buildings in Latvia